Ak-Jol is a village in the Sokuluk District of Chüy Region of Kyrgyzstan. Its population was 3,358 in 2021.

References

Populated places in Chüy Region